Paidi is an instrument that consists of two to four parallel dizis of different length bound together. It was invented by Zhao Songting at the beginning of 1960s. Compared with the conventional dizi, paidi has a wider range and can produce different timbres.

References

External links 
"Birds in Shade" by Du Rusong
"Busy Plucking Tea-Leaves" by Tsai Hsueh Jen

Side-blown flutes
Chinese musical instruments